Landscape (Spanish: Paisaje) is an oil on panel painting by Flemish painter Joos de Momper. 

The work is considered today a collaboration between de Momper and Jan Brueghel the Elder, and is currently housed at the Museum of Prado in Madrid.

References

Further reading
 Salas, Xavier de, Museo del Prado. Catálogo de las pinturas, Museo del Prado, Madrid, 1972.
 Díaz Padrón, Matías, Museo del Prado: catálogo de pinturas. Escuela flamenca, Museo del Prado; Patrimonio Nacional de Museos, Madrid, 1975.
 Museo Nacional del Prado, Museo del Prado. Catálogo de las pinturas, Museo del Prado, Madrid, 1985, pp. 433.
 Museo Nacional del Prado, Museo del Prado: inventario general de pinturas, I, Museo del Prado, Espasa Calpe, Madrid, 1990, pp. nº1564.
 Díaz Padrón, Matías, El siglo de Rubens en el Museo del Prado: catálogo razonado, Prensa Ibérica, Barcelona, 1996, pp. 256.

External links
Paisaje at the Museum of Prado

17th-century paintings
Paintings of the Museo del Prado by Flemish artists
Landscape paintings
Paintings by Joos de Momper
Paintings by Jan Brueghel the Elder